Surducu may refer to one of two places in Romania:

Surducu Mare, a village in Forotic Commune, Caraș-Severin County
Surducu Mic, a village in Traian Vuia Commune, Timiș County

See also 
 Surdu (disambiguation)
 Surduc (disambiguation)
 Surdila (disambiguation)
 Surdești (disambiguation)